In mathematics, the pointwise product of two functions is another function, obtained by multiplying the images of the two functions at each value in the domain.

Formal definition
Let  and  be sets such that  has a notion of multiplication — that is, there is a binary operation
  given by 
Then given two functions  the pointwise product  is defined by

 

Examples
The most common case of the pointwise product of two functions is when the codomain is a ring (or field), in which multiplication is well-defined.

Algebraic application of pointwise products
Let  be a set and let  be a ring.

 

Generalization
If both  and  have as their domain all possible assignments of a set of discrete variables, then their pointwise product is a function whose domain is constructed by all possible assignments of the union of both sets. The value of each assignment is calculated as the product of the values of both functions given to each one the subset of the assignment that is in its domain.

See also
Pointwise

Elementary algebra
Binary operations